= You Can't Hide from the Truth =

2016 Zimbabwean musical documentary film

You Can’t Hide From The Truth
- Directed by: A.a.V. Amasi
- Written by: A.a.V. Amasi
- Produced by: A.a.V. Amasi
- Starring: Daniel Gonora
- Cinematography: A.a.V. Amasi
- Edited by: Jojo Erholtz; Pawel Slomkowski
- Music by: Annie Lloyd; Pan Papagiannopolus
- Production company: Goatfame
- Release date: 28 February 2016; (UK)
- Running time: 29 minutes
- Countries: United Kingdom; Zimbabwe
- Languages: Afrikaans; English

You Can’t Hide From The Truth, is a 2016 Zimbabwean direct-to-video musical documentary film directed and produced by A.a.V. Amasi for Goatfame. The film is a musical documentary about a blind musician father and son who are struggling to make ends meet in Zimbabwe's harsh political and economic environment.

The film made its premier in February 2016 in the United Kingdom. The film received mixed reviews from critics and screened at many film festivals. In 2017 at the European Film Festival of Lille, the film won the Best Documentary Award and later won the Best International Documentary Film in Best International Film category at the Festival Brasil Cinema Internacional. In the same year, the film won the Best Mid-Length Film Award at the Tirana International Film Festival, AL. Apart from that the film also nominated for the One World Media Award for Student Award at the One World Media Awards and Best Documentary Award at the International Children's Film Festival Bangladesh in 2017.
